Jeene Do is a  1990 Indian Hindi-language action drama film directed by Rajesh Sethi. It stars Sanjay Dutt, Jackie Shroff, Farah, Sonam in pivotal roles.

Cast
 Sanjay Dutt as Karamveer
 Jackie Shroff as Suraj 
 Farah as Chanda
 Sonam as Sujata 
 Kulbhushan Kharbanda as Rehmat  
 Shakti Kapoor as Inspector Himmat Singh
 Anupam Kher as Hardayal
 Amrish Puri as Thakur Sher Bahadur Singh
 Beena Banerjee as Krishna
 Jagdish Raj as Sujata's Father
 Aparajita Mohanty as Sujata's Mother

Soundtrack
Lyrics: Anand Bakshi

External links

1990 films
1990s Hindi-language films
Films scored by R. D. Burman